See also Bara Pind (Shakargarh Tehsil, Narowal District, Punjab, Pakistan)

Bara Pind  is a village in  Tehsil Phillaur of  Jalandhar District of State Punjab. It is on the Goraya-Masani Banga road, close to  Birk village. Bara Pind is well linked by road with Phagwara, Phillaur, Goraya and other neighboring villages and towns. It has historical gurudwaras, mandirs and mosques.

Goraya Railway Station (5 km) serves this area. The nearest airport is at Ludhiana.

External links
A web site barapind.com containing complete information regarding Barapind.

Villages in Jalandhar district
Villages in Phillaur tehsil